Presidential elections were held in Zaire on 29 July 1984. At the time, the country was a one-party state with the Popular Movement of the Revolution as the only legal party. Its leader, incumbent president Mobutu Sese Seko, was the only candidate, with voters asked to vote "yes" or "no" to his candidacy. The results showed 99.16% of voters casting a "yes" vote.

Results

References

Single-candidate elections
Presidential elections in the Democratic Republic of the Congo
1984 in Zaire
One-party elections
Zaire
Election and referendum articles with incomplete results